Benjamin Agyare (born 8 May 1994) is a Ghanaian footballer who plays as an centre-back for Albanian club Apolonia, where is the captain.

References

External links
 

1994 births
Living people
Ghanaian footballers
Association football defenders
Ghana Premier League players
Accra Hearts of Oak S.C. players
Heart of Lions F.C. players
KF Apolonia Fier players
Kategoria Superiore players
Ghanaian expatriate footballers
Ghanaian expatriate sportspeople in Albania
Expatriate footballers in Albania
Footballers from Accra